The Convention for the Protection of Producers of Phonograms Against Unauthorized Duplication of Their Phonograms, also known as the Geneva Phonograms Convention, is a 1971 international agreement relating to copyright protection for sound recordings.

Legal context

By the mid-1950s, the Berne Convention for the Protection of Literary and Artistic Works, the Buenos Aires Convention and Universal Copyright Convention granted strong rights to creators of printed or artistic content – and also to composers and performers of music – in most first world countries. The publisher of a book could prosecute a maker of unauthorized copies even if they operated in a different country. But there was no equivalent protection for sound recordings.

The 1961 Rome Convention for the first time granted international recognition for copyright in sound recordings. Now music labels were recognized as having a copyright interest in the recording itself, separately from the composer and performer. This gave them standing to prosecute makers of unauthorized copies of their tapes or records in other countries.

Technological context

In the mid-1960s music labels began producing pre-recorded compact cassettes, a technology developed in the late 1950s which offered relatively compact players and space-efficient storage compared to vinyl records. It was also very much cheaper and simpler to make unauthorized copies compared to vinyl records. By the late 1960s copyright infringement and counterfeiting of these recordings had become common, and the music industry lobbied for a new international treaty which would give them additional powers to combat copyright infringement.

The 1971 convention

The 1971 convention granted record producers the international right to block imports of counterfeit music recordings, and to take action against distributors and retailers who sold them.

Specific requirement for protection
Unlike the Berne Convention, which does not require formalities to obtain protection, the Geneva Phonograms convention does provide one formality. To secure protection under this convention, copies of the sound recording must carry a copyright notice, one exclusively for sound recordings. The notice consists of the phonogram copyright symbol, "℗" which is the upper case letter "P"  in a circle, the year of publication, and the copyright owner's name. In this way, the Geneva Phonograms Convention is similar to the notice requirement of the Universal Copyright Convention.

See also

 List of parties to international treaties protecting rights related to copyright
 Sound recording copyright symbol
 Related rights
 Rome Convention for the Protection of Performers, Producers of Phonograms and Broadcasting Organisations
 WIPO Performances and Phonograms Treaty

References

External links
 Convention for the Protection of Producers of Phonograms Against Unauthorized Duplication of Their Phonograms  in the WIPO Lex database — official website of WIPO.
The full text of the Convention for the Protection of Producers of Phonograms Against Unauthorized Duplication of Their Phonograms 
 Ratifications

Copyright treaties
World Intellectual Property Organization treaties
Treaties concluded in 1971
Treaties entered into force in 1973
Treaties of Albania
Treaties of Argentina
Treaties of Armenia
Treaties of Australia
Treaties of Austria
Treaties of Azerbaijan
Treaties of Barbados
Treaties of Belarus
Treaties of Bosnia and Herzegovina
Treaties of the military dictatorship in Brazil
Treaties of Bulgaria
Treaties of Burkina Faso
Treaties of Chile
Treaties of the People's Republic of China
Treaties of Colombia
Treaties of Zaire
Treaties of Costa Rica
Treaties of Croatia
Treaties of the Czech Republic
Treaties of Denmark
Treaties of Ecuador
Treaties of El Salvador
Treaties of Estonia
Treaties of Fiji
Treaties of Finland
Treaties of France
Treaties of West Germany
Treaties of Ghana
Treaties of Greece
Treaties of Guatemala
Treaties of Honduras
Treaties of the Hungarian People's Republic
Treaties of India
Treaties of Israel
Treaties of Italy
Treaties of Jamaica
Treaties of Japan
Treaties of Kazakhstan
Treaties of Kenya
Treaties of South Korea
Treaties of Kyrgyzstan
Treaties of Latvia
Treaties of Liberia
Treaties of Liechtenstein
Treaties of Lithuania
Treaties of Luxembourg
Treaties of North Macedonia
Treaties of Mexico
Treaties of Moldova
Treaties of Monaco
Treaties of Montenegro
Treaties of the Netherlands
Treaties of Nicaragua
Treaties of Norway
Treaties of Panama
Treaties of Paraguay
Treaties of Peru
Treaties of Romania
Treaties of Russia
Treaties of Saint Lucia
Treaties of Serbia and Montenegro
Treaties of Slovakia
Treaties of Slovenia
Treaties of Francoist Spain
Treaties of Sweden
Treaties of Switzerland
Treaties of Togo
Treaties of Trinidad and Tobago
Treaties of Ukraine
Treaties of the United Kingdom
Treaties of the United States
Treaties of Uruguay
Treaties of the Holy See
Treaties of Venezuela
Treaties of Vietnam
Treaties of Czechoslovakia
Treaties of New Zealand
Treaties of Tajikistan
1971 in Switzerland
Treaties extended to Bermuda
Treaties extended to the British Virgin Islands
Treaties extended to the Cayman Islands
Treaties extended to Gibraltar
Treaties extended to the Isle of Man
Treaties extended to Montserrat
Treaties extended to Greenland
Treaties extended to the Faroe Islands
Treaties extended to British Hong Kong
Treaties extended to British Saint Lucia
Treaties extended to the Crown Colony of Seychelles
Treaties extended to West Berlin